Vizard or visard may refer to:

 Visard, a mask worn by women in 16th- and 17th-century fashion
 Vizard (surname)
 Vizards, characters in the Bleach manga and anime